Matheus Santos Carneiro Cunha (born 27 May 1999), commonly known as Matheus Cunha, is a Brazilian professional footballer who plays as a forward for Premier League club Wolverhampton Wanderers, on loan from La Liga club Atlético Madrid, and the Brazil national team. 

Cunha played youth football in Brazil for Coritiba. At the age of 18, he moved to Europe to join Swiss club Sion. He then played for Bundesliga clubs RB Leipzig and Hertha BSC, before joining Atlético in August 2021.

Cunha won a gold medal with the Brazil under-23 team at the 2020 Summer Olympics. He made his senior international debut in September 2021.

Early life
Cunha was born in the city of João Pessoa, Brazil. As a child he played futsal for a club in Recife, before switching to football.

Club career

FC Sion
Cunha played youth football for Coritiba, before joining Swiss club Sion at the age of 18 in July 2017, after impressing scouts at the Dallas Cup youth tournament. In May 2018, he scored a hat-trick in a 4–1 victory over FC Thun.

RB Leipzig
On 24 June 2018, Cunha joined Bundesliga club RB Leipzig on a five-year-deal. He scored his maiden Bundesliga goal against his future club Hertha BSC, to mark a 3–0 win in November 2018. He scored a goal against Bayer Leverkusen in April 2019 that won the Bundesliga Goal of the Month award, and was nominated for the FIFA Puskás Award. He finished the 2018–19 UEFA Europa League season with 6 goals.

Hertha BSC
On 31 January 2020, Hertha BSC announced the signing of Cunha, the Brazilian arriving for a fee of €18 Million.

Atlético Madrid
On 25 August 2021, he joined Atlético Madrid on a five-year contract for a fee of €30 Million. He scored his first goal against Levante UD to seal a 2–2 draw.

Wolverhampton Wanderers
On 1 January 2023, he joined Wolverhampton Wanderers on loan for the remainder of the 2022–23 season, with the move becoming permanent in the summer of 2023 should certain stipulations in the loan agreement be met.

International career

Under-23 team
With Brazil's under-23 team, Cunha was the top scorer of the 2019 Toulon Tournament and the 2020 CONMEBOL Pre-Olympic Tournament, winning the former and finishing as runner-up in the latter, thus securing qualification to the Olympics for the Brazil team with the latter performance. On 17 June 2021, he was named in Brazil's squad for the 2020 Summer Olympics in Tokyo. In August 2021, he won a gold medal with Brazil at the Olympics, having scored 3 goals in 5 appearances at the tournament. Overall, Cunha has scored 21 goals in 24 games for the under-23 team.

Senior team
In September 2020, Cunha was called up to the senior Brazil squad for 2022 FIFA World Cup qualification matches against Bolivia and Peru on 9 and 13 October 2020, respectively.

He made his debut for the senior national team on 2 September 2021, in a World Cup qualifier against Chile, a 1–0 away victory. He substituted Gabriel Barbosa in the 78th minute.

Career statistics

Club

International

Honours
Brazil U23
Summer Olympics: 2020
Toulon Tournament: 2019
Individual
Toulon Tournament Top Scorer: 2019
Toulon Tournament Best XI: 2019
CONMEBOL Pre-Olympic Tournament Top scorer: 2020

References

External links

1999 births
Living people
Association football wingers
Brazilian footballers
People from João Pessoa, Paraíba
FC Sion players
RB Leipzig players
Hertha BSC players
Atlético Madrid footballers
Wolverhampton Wanderers F.C. players
Swiss Super League players
Bundesliga players
La Liga players
Premier League players
Brazilian expatriate footballers
Expatriate footballers in Switzerland
Expatriate footballers in Germany
Expatriate footballers in Spain
Expatriate footballers in England
Brazilian expatriate sportspeople in Switzerland
Brazilian expatriate sportspeople in Germany
Brazilian expatriate sportspeople in Spain
Brazilian expatriate sportspeople in England
Brazil youth international footballers
Brazil international footballers
Olympic footballers of Brazil
Footballers at the 2020 Summer Olympics
Olympic medalists in football
Olympic gold medalists for Brazil
Medalists at the 2020 Summer Olympics
Sportspeople from Paraíba